Turold / Touroude, Sire de Pont-Audemer / de Ponteaudemer (born c. 950 A.D.) was a Norman aristocrat in Normandy that is today a region of France.

The son of Torf, he inherited the title of Seigneur du Pontautou (Pont-Authou), de Torville (Tourville), Torcy (in Normandy) and Torny (Tourny). He became Sire de Pont-Audemer, he made it his main residence. 

Turold married Duvelina, younger sister of Gunnor, the wife of Richard I of Normandy. By his marriage, he enhanced his position in Norman nobility and became a prominent figure during the reigns of Richard II, Duke of Normandy; Richard III, Duke of Normandy; and Robert I, Duke of Normandy (996-1035). 

Turold and Duvelina had:

 Humphrey de Vieilles du Ponteaudemer 
 Herbrand du Ponteaudemer
 Ilbert or Gilbert du Ponteaudemer
 Richard du Ponteaudemer

Humphrey de Vieilles is the father of Roger de Beaumont.

References

Sources

10th-century Normans
950s births
Year of birth uncertain
Year of death unknown
Medieval French nobility